Floyd is a town in Floyd County, Virginia, United States. The population was 425 at the 2010 census. It is the county seat of Floyd County. The Town of Floyd was originally named Jacksonville as the surrounding county was formed during the tenure of President Andrew Jackson. The name was subsequently changed to Floyd for Virginia governor John Floyd.

History
The Floyd Historic District, Floyd Presbyterian Church, Glenanna, Phlegar Farm, and Oakdale are listed on the National Register of Historic Places.

Geography
According to the United States Census Bureau, the town has a total area of 0.5 square miles (1.2 km2), all of it land.

Climate
The climate in this area is characterized by hot, humid summers and generally mild to cool winters.  According to the Köppen Climate Classification system, Floyd has a humid subtropical climate, abbreviated "Cfa" on climate maps.

Demographics

As of the census of 2000, there were 432 people, 238 households, and 117 families residing in the town. The population density was 942.3 people per square mile (362.6/km2). There were 264 housing units at an average density of 575.9 per square mile (221.6/km2). The racial makeup of the town was 93.29% White, 4.63% African American, 0.23% Asian, 0.23% Pacific Islander, 0.69% from other races, and 0.93% from two or more races. Hispanic or Latino of any race were 0.69% of the population.

There were 238 households, out of which 18.5% had children under the age of 18 living with them, 34.0% were married couples living together, 12.6% had a female householder with no husband present, and 50.8% were non-families. 49.6% of all households were made up of individuals, and 31.1% had someone living alone who was 65 years of age or older. The average household size was 1.82 and the average family size was 2.57.

In the town, the population was spread out, with 18.5% under the age of 18, 4.6% from 18 to 24, 22.7% from 25 to 44, 23.4% from 45 to 64, and 30.8% who were 65 years of age or older. The median age was 48 years. For every 100 females, there were 70.8 males. For every 100 females age 18 and over, there were 66.0 males.

The median income for a household in the town was $25,781, and the median income for a family was $40,938. Males had a median income of $27,232 versus $19,464 for females. The per capita income for the town was $23,557. About 10.4% of families and 13.2% of the population were below the poverty line, including 7.5% of those under age 18 and 16.9% of those age 65 or over.

Arts and culture
The Town of Floyd is becoming known as a regional destination for music, especially bluegrass music, and old-time music.  The Floyd Country Store's Friday Night Jamboree, which features local and area bands, has been held each Friday night for many years, gaining in popularity during the past decade.  In fair weather, the indoor stage performances and dancing are joined by simultaneous banjo-and-fiddle-centered jam sessions in driveways and seating areas along South Locust Street. Local old time string band The Alum Ridge Boys & Ashlee won first prize at the 85th Annual Old Fiddlers' Convention held in Galax, Virginia.  County Sales, a notable music distribution company founded by David Freeman focusing on old-time, bluegrass and related music, is located in the town. 

Floyd is also home to a large counter-culture movement. There are other musical venues and stages in the town, featuring many different styles of music. The Winter Sun, a complex in downtown Floyd, frequently hosts shows for bands. The National Music Festival, focused on classical music, hosted its first season in Floyd in 2011. 

Floyd is the location of Red Rooster Coffee.

Notable people
 Donna Polseno, visual artist known for pottery, ceramics, and sculpture
 Curtis Turner, former NASCAR driver
 Don Williams, Major League Baseball pitcher
 Morgan Wade, singer

See also
National Register of Historic Places in Floyd County, Virginia
Chateau Morrisette Winery

References

External links

Towns in Floyd County, Virginia
Towns in Virginia
County seats in Virginia